Keanapuka Mountain is a mountain located on the Hawaiian Island of Kauai. It rises 4,000 ft above the ocean floor and is located near the border of Na Pali Coast State Park. Due to its location, the mountain receives intense amounts of rain.

Mountains of Hawaii